Fumel is a commune in the Lot-et-Garonne department in south-western France. Situated at the right bank of the river Lot, it is the centre of a small agglomeration (population 13,028 in 2017) which consists of 7 communes, including Monsempron-Libos and Montayral.
In 1438, during the Hundred Years' War, it was pillaged by Rodrigo de Villandrando.
It is twinned with Uttoxeter, United Kingdom.

See also
Communes of the Lot-et-Garonne department

References

Communes of Lot-et-Garonne
Agenais